Christophe Meslin (born 13 July 1977) is a French former professional footballer who played as a striker.

External links

1977 births
Living people
Association football forwards
French footballers
Stade Rennais F.C. players
OGC Nice players
SC Bastia players
En Avant Guingamp players
Gazélec Ajaccio players
RC Grasse players
Ligue 1 players
Ligue 2 players